The 2014 P&G U.S. National Gymnastics Championships was the 51st edition of the U.S. National Gymnastics Championships. The competition was held from August 21–24, 2014 at the CONSOL Energy Center in Pittsburgh, Pennsylvania.

Event information 
The fifty-first edition of the Championships, the competition was held at the CONSOL Energy Center in Pittsburgh, Pennsylvania; the home arena of the Pittsburgh Penguins. It was the first time the U.S. Championships have been held in Pennsylvania since 2001 and just the fourth since 1973.  The competition was televised by NBC Sports Network.

Competition schedule 
The competition featured Senior and Junior competitions for both women's and men's disciplines. The competition was as follows;

Thursday, August 21

1:00 pm – Jr. Women's Competition – Day 1
7:45 pm – Sr. Women's Competition – Day 1

Friday, August 22

1:00 pm – Jr. Men's Competition – Day 1
7:15 pm – Sr. Men's Competition – Day 1

Saturday, August 23

1:00 pm – Jr. Women's Competition – Final Day
7:30 pm – Sr. Women's Competition – Final Day

Sunday, August 24

1:30 pm – Sr. Men's Competition – Final Day
7:30 pm – Jr. Men's Competition – Final Day

Note: all times are in Eastern Time Zone.

Sponsorship 
Procter & Gamble, a multinational consumer goods company, was the title sponsor of the event; as part of the a deal the company signed with USA Gymnastics from 2013–16. The competition was also presented by CoverGirl and Gilette. In addition, Vera Bradley, Deloitte, Kroger, OneAmerica, Faegre Baker Daniels and Washington National were all sponsoring the event.

Medalists

National Team
The top 6 placing seniors were automatically named National Team – Simone Biles, Kyla Ross, Maggie Nichols, Alyssa Baumann, MyKayla Skinner, and Amelia Hundley.  Additionally Ashton Locklear, Madison Kocian, Brenna Dowell, and Madison Desch were also named to the team.  As for juniors Jordan Chiles, Nia Dennis, Norah Flatley, Jazmyn Foberg, Emily Gaskins, Bailie Key, and Alexis Vasquez were all named to the junior national team.

Participants 
The following individuals are participating in competition:

Senior

 Alyssa Baumann
 Simone Biles
 Madison Desch
 Brenna Dowell
 
 
 Felicia Hano
 Veronica Hults
 Amelia Hundley
 Madison Kocian
 Ashton Locklear
 Maggie Nichols
 Kyla Ross
 Emily Schild
 MyKayla Skinner
 Macy Toronjo

Junior

 Ariana Agrapides
 Elena Arenas
 Rachel Baumann
 Aria Brusch
 Jordan Chiles
 Nia Dennis
 Christina Desiderio
 Bailey Ferrer
 Rachael Flam
 Norah Flatley
 Jazmyn Foberg
 Molly Frack
 Margzetta Frazier
 Megan Freed
 Emily Gaskins
 Delanie Harkness
 Morgan Hurd
 Sydney Johnson-Scharpf
 Shilese Jones
 Adeline Kenlin
 
 Taylor Lawson
 Maggie Musselman
 Lauren Navarro
 Victoria Nguyen
 Maile O'Keefe
 Marissa Oakley
 Abby Paulson
 Adriana Popp
 Grace Quinn
 Lexy Ramler
 Alyona Shchennikova
 Megan Skaggs
 Ragan Smith
 Deanne Soza
 Olivia Trautman
 Alexis Vasquez

References 

U.S. National Gymnastics Championships
Gymnastics competitions in the United States
U.S. National Gymnastics Championships
National Gymnastics Championships
U.S. National Gymnastics Championships 
U.S. National Gymnastics Championships